Denver Samuel Church (December 11, 1862 – February 21, 1952) was an American lawyer and politician who served three terms as a U.S. Representative from California from 1913 to 1919, then a fourth term from 1933 to 1935.

Biography 
Born in Folsom, California, Church attended the common schools. He was graduated from Healdsburg (California) College in 1885 and then studied law.
Church was admitted to the bar in 1893 and commenced practice in Fresno, California. He served as district attorney of Fresno County from 1907 to 1913, and was a delegate to the Democratic National Convention in 1916.

Congress 
Church was elected as a Democrat to the Sixty-third, Sixty-fourth, and Sixty-fifth Congresses (March 4, 1913 – March 3, 1919). On April 5, 1917, he was one of 50 representatives who voted against declaring war on Germany. He did not seek renomination in 1918.

He resumed the practice of law in Fresno and served as a judge of the Fresno County Superior Court from 1924 to 1930.

Church was elected to the Seventy-third Congress (March 4, 1933 – January 3, 1935), but was not a candidate for renomination in 1934. He resumed the practice of law and died in Fresno on February 21, 1952. He was interred in Belmont Memorial Park.

He is the maternal grandfather of famed film director Sam Peckinpah.

References

1862 births
1952 deaths
Democratic Party members of the United States House of Representatives from California
San Francisco Bay Area politicians